Pierre Drancourt (born 10 May 1982 in Maubeuge) is a French road bicycle racer for ESEG Douai, a French amateur team.

Professional Teams

Major results

2013
2nd GP Ville de Pérenchies

References

External links 
 

1982 births
Living people
People from Maubeuge
French male cyclists
Sportspeople from Nord (French department)
Cyclists from Hauts-de-France